The 1975 Benson & Hedges British Open Championships was held at Wembley Squash Centre in London from 30 January - 7 February 1975. Qamar Zaman won the title defeating Gogi Alauddin in the final.

Seeds

Draw and results

Final
 Qamar Zaman beat  Gogi Alauddin 9-7 9-6 9-1

Third Place
 Ken Hiscoe beat  Hiddy Jahan 9-5 9-2 8-10 9-4

Section 1

Section 2

References

Men's British Open Squash Championships
Men's British Open
Men's British Open Squash Championship
Men's British Open Squash Championship
Men's British Open Squash Championship
Men's British Open Squash Championship
Squash competitions in London